"Holy Water" is a song co-written and recorded by American country music duo Big & Rich.  It was released in September 2004 as the third single from debut album Horse of a Different Color.  It reached number 15 on the U.S. Billboard Hot Country Songs chart.  The song was written by Big Kenny, John Rich, Vicky McGehee and Jeff Cohen.

Content
The duo wrote the song in honor of their sisters, both of whom had been affected by domestic abuse.

Music video
The music video was directed by Deaton-Flanigen Productions and Marc Oswald. It premiered in November 2004. It first shows an intro, with Rich and Big Kenny's sisters. The rest of the video is of the duo playing, interspersed with images of women who have - presumably - been victims of abuse.

Personnel
From Horse of a Different Color liner notes.

 Big Kenny - vocals
 Brian Barnett - drums, tambourine
 Mike Johnson - steel guitar
 Matt Pierson - bass guitar
 John Rich - vocals, acoustic guitar
 Michael Rojas - keyboards
 Adam Shoenfeld - electric guitar
 Jonathan Yudkin - mandolin, strings

Chart positions
"Holy Water" debuted at 51 on the U.S Billboard Hot Country Singles & Tracks for the week of October 2, 2004.

References

2004 singles
Big & Rich songs
Songs written by Big Kenny
Songs written by John Rich
Song recordings produced by Paul Worley
Music videos directed by Deaton-Flanigen Productions
Song recordings produced by John Rich
Warner Records singles
Songs written by Vicky McGehee
Songs written by Jeff Cohen (songwriter)
2004 songs